This is a list of transfers in Dutch football for the 2010 summer transfer window. Only moves featuring an Eredivisie side and/or an Eerste Divisie side are listed.

The summer transfer window will open on July 1, 2010, and will close on September 1. Deals may be signed at any given moment in the season, but the actual transfer may only take place during the transfer window. Unattached players may sign at any moment.

Eredivisie

ADO Den Haag

In:

Out:

AFC Ajax

In:

Out:

AZ

In:

Out:

Excelsior

In:

Out:

Feyenoord

In:

Out:

De Graafschap

In:

Out:

FC Groningen

In:

Out:

SC Heerenveen

In:

Out:

Heracles Almelo

In:

Out:

NAC Breda

In:

Out:

NEC

In:

Out:

.

PSV

In:

Out:

Roda JC

In:

Out:

FC Twente

In:

Out:

FC Utrecht

In:

Out:

Vitesse

In:

Out:

VVV Venlo

In:

Out:

Willem II

In:

Out:

Eerste Divisie

AGOVV Apeldoorn

In:

Out:

.

Almere City FC

In:

Out:

SC Cambuur

In:

Out:

FC Den Bosch

In:

Out:

FC Dordrecht

In:

Out:

FC Eindhoven

In:

Out:

FC Emmen

In:

Out:

Fortuna Sittard

In:

Out:

Go Ahead Eagles

In:

Out:

Helmond Sport

In:

Out:

MVV

In:

Out:

RBC Roosendaal

In:

Out:

RKC Waalwijk

In:

Out:

Sparta Rotterdam

In:

Out:

Telstar

In:

Out:

BV Veendam

In:

Out:

FC Volendam

In:

Out:

FC Zwolle

In:

Out:

See also
 Football in the Netherlands
 Transfer window

References

Transfers Summer 2010
2010
Dutch